Zhao Jing may refer to:

Zhao Jing (Tang dynasty) (736–796), Tang Dynasty chancellor
Michael Anti (journalist) (born 1975), named Zhao Jing, Chinese journalist and political blogger
Zhao Jing (runner) (born 1988), Chinese middle-distance runner
Zhao Jing (swimmer) (born 1990), female Chinese swimmer

See also
 Zhao Jin (disambiguation)